Râmnicelu is a commune located in Brăila County, Muntenia, Romania. It has four villages: Boarca, Constantinești, Mihail Kogălniceanu (formerly Domnița), and Râmnicelu.

The commune is situated in the upper reaches of the Bărăgan Plain. It lies on both banks of the Buzău River, with Râmnicelu on the southern side and the three other villages on the northern side, connected by a bridge in Boarca.

County road DJ221, which runs from Brăila to Iancu, passes through Râmnicelu village. 

Its neighbors are the following communes: Scorțaru Nou to the northeast, Gemenele to the east, Movila Miresii to the south, Șuțești to the southwest, and Racovița to the west and northwest.

At the 2011 census, 86.11% of inhabitants were Romanians and 11.57% Roma.

It was in Ion Sion, part of Râmnicelu, that on 10 August 1951, Romania's hottest temperature on record, was observed.

Much of the phreatic zone under Râmnicelu is contaminated with nitrates and nitrites, which are chemicals that cannot be eliminated by boiling the water from wells.

Notes

Communes in Brăila County
Localities in Muntenia